Kalipada Pahan (born 19 February 1964; Midnapore) is a Professor of Neurological Sciences, Biochemistry and Pharmacology, and the Floyd A. Davis, M.D., Endowed Chair in Neurology at the Rush University Medical Center. He is also a research career scientist at the Department of Veterans Affairs, Jesse Brown VA Medical Center. He is an eminent Indian American neuroscientist involved in translational research on multiple sclerosis, Parkinson's disease, Alzheimer's disease, dementia, and Batten disease. He is known for his research on statins, cholesterol-lowering drugs. He first explored the application of statins in suppressing the inflammatory events in microglia, astroglia and macrophages. This finding has revolutionized the research on statin drugs. Later his lab has shown that statins may be beneficial in protecting neurons and improving locomotor activities in Parkinson's disease by suppressing the activation of p21/Ras. His lab is also famous for research on cinnamon where they have described that this commonly-used natural spice may be beneficial for different brain disorders including improving memory and learning of poor learners. Recently his lab has delineated a unique crosstalk between fat and memory in which the lipid-lowering transcription factor PPARalpha controls the formation of hippocampal memory via transcriptional regulation of CREB (Roy et al., 2013, Cell Reports 4: 724–737), suggesting a possible reason for the connection between excess belly fat and memory loss.

He has written many book chapters and published more than 200 articles in many peer-reviewed journals including Journal of Biological Chemistry, Journal of Immunology, Journal of Neuroscience, Cell Death and Differentiation, Proceedings of the National Academy of Sciences of the United States of America, Journal of Clinical Investigation, Science Signaling, Cell Reports, Cell Metabolism, Nature Communications, and Nature Chemical Biology. He is the recipient of "D. H. Reinhardt Scholar" award from the University of Nebraska Medical Center (UNMC) College of Dentistry, the "Silver U" award from the UNMC Chancellor's council, and the outstanding teaching award from the UNMC College of Dentistry. He also received the Zenith Fellows Award from the Alzheimer's Association.

References

Living people
1964 births
Rush University faculty
People from Midnapore
Indian neuroscientists